Aucelon is a commune in the department of Drôme, southeastern France. It is found in the Auvergne-Rhône-Alpes region.

Geography
Aucelon is a village perched at an altitude of 755 meters, towards the center of the mountain rings of Diosis. Aucelon's mountain has a height of 1356 meters. It is located in the south west of Die Tand, extends to the north of the Fourniers, and overlooks the valley of Roanne. The town is watered by the Brette.

Demography
In 1821, the municipality of Aucelon had 458 inhabitants, which declined to only 13 in 2012.

See also
Communes of the Drôme department

References

Communes of Drôme
Dauphiné